Kaushambi may refer to:

 Kosambi, an ancient city of India; Kosambi is a Pali language name; the original Sanskrit name of the city was Kaushambi
 Kaushambi district, a district in Uttar Pradesh, India
 Kaushambi (Lok Sabha constituency)
 Kaushambi (Ghaziabad), a neighbourhood of Ghaziabad city in Uttar Pradesh, India
 Kaushambi metro station in Delhi, India

See also 
 Kosambi (disambiguation)